Henriette Steenstrup (born 29 September 1974) is a Norwegian actress, comedian and scriptwriter.

Personal life
Steenstrup was born in Oslo on 29 September 1974. She was married to actor Fridtjov Såheim from 2006 to 2016, and has two children with him. She married political scientist Rune Assmann in 2019.

Career
With a background as child actress for NRK, appearing in audio plays and in television shows such as the advent calendar Jul i Skomakergata, Halvsju and Kroppen, Steenstrup's first adult television commission was in 1996 co-hosting the children's show Kykelikokos. She attended Lee Strasberg Theatre and Film Institute in New York, and after graduating from Teaterhøgskolen in 2003, she was assigned to Nationaltheatret from 2004. Her breakthrough as scriptwriter was the TV show  for TV2 in 2008.

In 2014 she won Komiprisen for the show En får væra som en er – en Ole Ivars-musikal. In her drama series  from 2021 she also played the principal role, for which she won . The series was awarded Gullruten in 2022 for best script for a drama series.

She has played minor roles in several films, starting from the mid-1990s. The films include Budbringeren (1997), Mother's Elling (2003), Comrade Pedersen (2006) and Turn Me On, Dammit! (2011). In 2019 she played the character "Liv" in Dag Johan Haugerud's Beware of Children, for which she won the Dragon Award for best acting at the Gothenburg Film Festival.

Her books include Verdens beste mamma – not (1913), and four books related to her comedy show character "Edel".

References

1974 births
Living people
People from Oslo
Lee Strasberg Theatre and Film Institute alumni
Norwegian child actresses
Norwegian comedians
Norwegian film actresses
Norwegian stage actresses
Norwegian screenwriters
NRK people